Silent Grace is a critically acclaimed feature film written and directed by Maeve Murphy and was made no. 38 in The Irish Times Best 50 Irish films ever made list on 2 May 2020. It is about friendship and survival.   A fictional story based on real events, covering the untold story of Republican women prisoners involvement in the 1980/81 Dirty Protest and first hunger strike.  It is inspired by Nell McCafferty's The Armagh Women and based on the play/screenplay "Now and at the hour of our Death" that Murphy co-wrote with theatre company Trouble and Strife.  Silent Grace stars Orla Brady, Cathleen Bradley, with Cara Seymour, Dawn Bradfield, Carol Scanlan, Conor Mullen, and Patrick Bergin. It received completion funds from The Irish Film Board.

Silent Grace was chosen as the UK entry for the Cannes Film Festival in 2002 but as it previously screened in the Cannes market in 2001, it could not be considered any further for competition. The film premiered at the Galway Film Fleadh 2001. It then was selected for the Taormina, Moscow, Foyle, Dinard and Hamptons International Film Festival USA (nominated for the Conflict and Resolution Award). A small cinema release followed in UK/Ireland via Guerilla Films in 2004.  Silent Grace was critically acclaimed, and was awarded the Soka Art Award (Japan).

Silent Grace experienced a revival and wider audience in 2017 after 3 major articles in the Irish Times Culture section about the women and the film that had been written out of history. On 24 June 2017, TV3 gave Silent Grace its nationwide broadcast premiere at primetime, in the Republic of Ireland, on Be3. TV3 said in IFTN "Silent Grace firmly puts women back in the 1980s narrative and makes compelling viewing". The Sunday Times made it one of the "Films of the Week"
The Foyle Film Festival had a special 20th anniversary screening of the film with a Q&A with Maeve Murphy and Orla Brady chaired by James Flynn in November 2020.

Plot
Aine a young tear away criminal is thrown into the same cell as Eileen, a high ranking Republican woman leader. At first at odds, Eileen helps save Aine's sanity.  An unlikely friendship develops between them as Aine joins the protest and Eileen helps her to survive. In a remarkable turn around of events when Eileen embarks on a hunger strike, Aine risks all to help save her life...

Cast
 Orla Brady as Eileen
 Cathleen Bradley as Aine
 Cara Seymour as Margaret
Dawn Bradley as Geraldine
Carol Scanlan as Aine's Mother
Rob Newman as Father McGarry
Conor Mullen as the Governor
Patrick Bergin as Peter/IRA Leader

Reception
Silent Grace was critically acclaimed. Michael Dwyer in the Irish Times gave it 3 stars and said it was "unusually even-handed, well judged... rooted in its humanist agenda, surmounts the limits of its very low budget, to emerge as a work of sincerity and concern." 
Tara Brady wrote in Dublin's Hot Press, where it was Critics Choice, "Maeve Murphy must be some kind  of genius... brilliantly confounds expectations... compelling coming of age drama, wonderfully humane... Orla Brady is magnificent.... I urge you to seek it out". Larushka Ivan-Zadeh in the Metro in London gave it 4 stars "compelling." And it was in their Top Ten Films for 2 weeks. Peter Bradshaw,  The Guardian said it "bodes well for Murphy's future movies". Ronnie Schieb in Variety,  David Parkinson in The Radio Times,  The Evening Standard, Rich Cline in Shadows on the Wall, Anton Bietel in Movie Gazette,  Belfast Telegraph and The Huffington Post reviewed it favourably.

However, as more films were made about the male hunger strikers, Silent Grace often ceased to be mentioned in the hunger strike film discourse. It wasn't until its 2017 revival when it was placed fully back on the map due to the promoting of the film from the Irish Times and TV3. Silent Grace was received very favourably, with a fresh review in The Irish Times Film Section and selected "Films of the Week" in The Sunday Times. Maeve Murphy and Patrick Bergin appeared on Breakfast TV on TV3 for the debut broadcast at prime time.

In May 2020, The Irish Times listed Silent Grace as number 38 in their list of the 50 greatest Irish films of all time.

The BFI added Silent Grace to their political film collection and Women with a Movie Camera Selection in 2022

References

External links

English-language Irish films
Films about The Troubles (Northern Ireland)
2000s English-language films